Liminal spaces are the subject of an Internet aesthetic portraying empty or abandoned places that appear eerie, forlorn, and often surreal. Liminal spaces are commonly places of transition (pertaining to the concept of liminality) or of nostalgic appeal. 

Research from the Journal of Environmental Psychology has indicated that liminal spaces may appear eerie or strange because they fall into an uncanny valley of architecture and physical places. An article from Pulse: the Journal of Science and Culture has attributed this eeriness to familiar places lacking their usually observed context. 

The aesthetic gained popularity in 2019 after a post on 4chan depicting a liminal space called the Backrooms went viral. Since then, liminal space images have been posted across the internet, including on Reddit, Twitter, and TikTok.

Characteristics
Broadly, the term liminal space is used to describe a place or state of change or transition; this may be physical (e.g. a doorway) or psychological (e.g. the period of adolescence). Liminal space imagery often depicts this sense of "in-between", capturing transitional places (such as stairwells, roads, corridors, or hotels) unsettlingly devoid of people. The aesthetic may convey moods of eeriness, surrealness, nostalgia, or sadness, and elicit responses of both comfort and unease. It can be seen as a place outside of time and space.

Research by Alexander Diel and Michael Lewis of Cardiff University has attributed the unsettling nature of liminal spaces to the phenomenon of the uncanny valley. The term, which is usually applied to humanoids whose inexact resemblance to humans elicits feelings of unease, may explain similar responses to liminal imagery. In this case, physical places that appear familiar but subtly deviate from reality create the sense of eeriness typical of liminal spaces. 

Peter Heft of Pulse: the Journal of Science and Culture further explores this sense of eeriness. Drawing on the works of Mark Fisher, Heft explains such eeriness may be felt when an individual views a situation in a different context to what they expect. For example, a schoolhouse, expected to be busy amalgamation of teachers and students, becomes unsettling when depicted as unnaturally empty. This "failure of presence" was considered by Fisher to be one of the hallmarks of the aesthetic experience of eeriness.

The increase in internet culture's interest in the aesthetic could be attributed to a post-pandemic world. Forced time at home and away from others led many to contemplate liminality, with themes like isolation and transition being key takeaways.

History

Images depicting liminal spaces gained popularity in 2019 when a short creepypasta of unknown origin was posted on 4chan and went viral. The creepypasta showed an image exemplifying a liminal space—a hallway with yellow carpets and wallpaper—with a caption purporting that by "noclipping out of bounds in real life", one may enter the Backrooms, an empty wasteland of corridors with nothing but "the stink of old moist carpet, the madness of mono-yellow, the endless background noise of fluorescent lights at maximum hum-buzz, and approximately six hundred million square miles of randomly segmented empty rooms to be trapped in".

Liminal space images soon gained popularity across the Internet. , a subreddit called /r/LiminalSpace has accrued over 500,000 members, liminal space photo-posting @SpaceLiminalBot on Twitter has accrued over 1.2 million followers, and the TikTok #liminalspaces hashtag has over two billion views.

See also
Dead mall
Non-place

References

Further reading

External links

/r/LiminalSpace on Reddit
@SpaceLiminalBot on Twitter

Visual arts genres
Creepypasta
Internet memes